Clementi Town Secondary School (CTSS) is a government secondary school located in Clementi, Singapore, founded in the 1980s.

History
The school was officially opened on 22 July 1982 by the then-Member for Parliament of Clementi Bernard Chen Tien Lap. In 1984, in order to prevent students loitering in public places, the school's prefects, in cooperation with the Students' Care Service, set up a location for students to relax and study after school hours. This centre was the first of its kind in secondary schools in Singapore.

Notable alumni
 Joi Chua: singer
 Derrick Hoh: singer
 Pornsak Prajakwit: television presenter, Mediacorp

See also
 List of schools in Singapore

References

External links
 Official website

Secondary schools in Singapore